Percyvall Hart Dyke (9 June 1799  – 12 November 1875) was an English amateur cricketer who played first-class cricket from 1822 to 1837.  He was mainly associated with Kent and Marylebone Cricket Club (MCC), of which he was a member.  He made 21 known appearances in first-class matches, including three for the Gentlemen.

References

1799 births
1875 deaths
English cricketers
English cricketers of 1787 to 1825
English cricketers of 1826 to 1863
Kent cricketers
Gentlemen cricketers
Marylebone Cricket Club cricketers
Gentlemen of Kent cricketers